Newer Than New is an album by pianist Barry Harris recorded in 1961 and released on the Riverside label.

Reception

Allmusic awarded the album 4½ stars with its review by Ronny D. Lankforth, Jr. stating, "the music still sounds fresh and exciting...  Jazz styles, like all styles, come and go, but great music like Newer Than New transcends styles".

Track listing 
All compositions by Barry Harris except as indicated
 "Mucho Dinero" - 3:44   
 "Easy to Love" (Cole Porter) - 4:50   
 "Burgundy" - 7:01   
 "The Last One" - 4:57   
 "Anthropology" (Dizzy Gillespie, Charlie Parker) - 4:17   
 "I Didn't Know What Time It Was" (Lorenz Hart, Richard Rodgers) - 4:12   
 "Make Haste" - 5:39   
 "Nightingale" (George Rosner, Fred Wise) - 5:17

Personnel 
Barry Harris - piano
Lonnie Hillyer - trumpet
Charles McPherson - alto saxophone
Ernie Farrow - bass
Clifford Jarvis - drums

References 

Barry Harris albums
1961 albums
Riverside Records albums
Albums produced by Orrin Keepnews